Crow Wing Lake Township is a township in Hubbard County, Minnesota, United States. The population was 266 at the 2000 census.

Crow Wing Lake Township was so named on account of there being many lakes near the Crow Wing River within its borders.

Geography

Demographics
As of the census of 2000, there were 266 people, 122 households, and 89 families residing in the township.  The population density was 9.0 people per square mile (3.5/km2).  There were 544 housing units at an average density of 18.5/sq mi (7.1/km2).  The racial makeup of the township was 97.74% White, 0.75% Native American, and 1.50% from two or more races. Hispanic or Latino of any race were 1.13% of the population.

There were 122 households, out of which 15.6% had children under the age of 18 living with them, 63.9% were married couples living together, 5.7% had a female householder with no husband present, and 27.0% were non-families. 22.1% of all households were made up of individuals, and 9.8% had someone living alone who was 65 years of age or older.  The average household size was 2.18 and the average family size was 2.53.

In the township the population was spread out, with 15.8% under the age of 18, 5.3% from 18 to 24, 16.5% from 25 to 44, 32.7% from 45 to 64, and 29.7% who were 65 years of age or older.  The median age was 54 years. For every 100 females, there were 114.5 males.  For every 100 females age 18 and over, there were 113.3 males.

The median income for a household in the township was $41,875, and the median income for a family was $44,250. Males had a median income of $29,375 versus $24,583 for females. The per capita income for the township was $21,673.  About 4.1% of families and 7.1% of the population were below the poverty line, including 16.7% of those under the age of eighteen and none of those 65 or over.

References

Townships in Hubbard County, Minnesota
Townships in Minnesota